Saint Sylvester's Day, also known as Silvester or the Feast of Saint Sylvester, is the day of the feast of Pope Sylvester I, a saint who served as Pope from 314 to 335. Medieval legend made him responsible for the conversion of emperor Constantine. Among the Western churches, the feast day is held on the anniversary of Saint Sylvester's death, 31 December, a date that, since the adoption of the Gregorian calendar, has coincided with New Year's Eve. For these Christian denominations, Saint Silvester's Day liturgically marks the seventh day of Christmastide. Eastern churches celebrate Sylvester's feast on a different day from the Western churches, i.e. on 2 January. Saint Sylvester's Day celebrations are marked by church attendance at a Watchnight Mass that is often held around midnight, as well as fireworks, partying, and feasting.

Pope Sylvester I 

Under the reign of Pope Sylvester I, several of the magnificent Christian churches were built, including the Basilica of Saint John Lateran, Santa Croce Church, and Old St. Peter's Basilica, among others. During the papacy of Sylvester I, the Nicene Creed, which is recited by communicants of the vast majority of the world's Christian denominations, was formulated. Sylvester is said to have healed, in the name of Christ, the emperor Constantine the Great of leprosy. After dying, Sylvester was buried on 31 December in the Catacomb of Priscilla.

Regional traditions

Several countries, primarily in Europe, use a variant of Silvester's name as the preferred name for the holiday; these countries include Austria, Bosnia and Herzegovina, Croatia, Czech Republic, France, Germany, Hungary, Israel, Italy, Liechtenstein, Luxembourg, Poland, Slovakia, Switzerland, and Slovenia.

Austria and Germany 
In the capital of Austria, Vienna, people walk pigs on leashes for their Saint Silvester's Day celebration in hope to have good luck for the coming year. Many Christian households in Germany mark Saint Silvester's Day by practicing the custom of Bleigiessen using Silvesterblei (Silvester lead), in which Silvesterblei is melted over a flame in an old spoon and dropped into a bowl of cold water; one's fortune for the coming year is determined by the shape of the lead. If the lead forms a ball (der Ball), luck will roll one's way, while the shape of a star (der Stern) signifies happiness.

Belgium 
Christians of Belgium have a tradition that a maiden who does not finish her work by the time of sunset on Saint Silvester's Day will not get married in the year to come.

Brazil 
Along with exploding fireworks, the Saint Silvester Road Race, Brazil's oldest and most prestigious running event, takes place on Saint Sylvester's Day and is dedicated to him.

Israel   
In Israel, New Year's Eve is referred to as Silvester to distinguish it from Rosh Hashanah—the Jewish New Year—which occurs in either September or October.

As many Israelis consider Pope Sylvester to have been an antisemite, the observation of New Year's Eve has been divisive among parts of the country's Jewish population, and celebrations tend to be relatively modest in comparison to other countries. In 2014, a report by a wearable technology manufacturer found that an average of 33% of Israelis went to bed before midnight on 31 December.

Soviet diaspora (such as Russian Jews) that celebrate Novy God—a secular observance of the New Year with elements of Christmas that was established by the Communist Party—have sometimes been criticized for celebrating an anti-semitic holiday. In the mid-2010's, campaigns emerged to promote the holiday to first and second-generation immigrants in Israel, as well as non-Russians, in an effort to build cultural awareness.

Italy 
On Saint Sylvester's Day, "lentils and slices of sausage are eaten because they look like coins and symbolize good fortune and the richness of life for the coming year."

Switzerland 

On the morning of Saint Sylvester's Day, the children of a Christian family compete with one another to see who can wake up the earliest; the child who arises the latest is playfully jeered. Men have, for centuries, masqueraded as Silvesterklaus on Saint Sylvester's Day.

References

External links

New Year celebrations
Sylvester